is a Japanese professional footballer who plays as a midfielder.

Club career
He started up his professional career at Tokyo Verdy where he won the 2004 Emperor's Cup and the 2005 Japanese Super Cup. In the same year, they were relegated from the J1 League, which marked his end in Tokyo. He signed for Omiya Ardija at the start of the 2006 season and quickly became their star player.

The club's successes were limited and after the 2008 season, he was offered the chance to go on trial at the Norwegian club Stabæk. His trial was a success, and in February 2009 he was loaned out to the Norwegian champions. He was given the number 10 shirt, which had recently been worn by Veigar Páll Gunnarsson. On 8 March, he made his official debut for Stabæk in the 2009 Super Cup. The league champions won 3–1 against cup champions Vålerenga. Kobayashi played an important part, getting on the score-sheet with a free kick and showing trickery with the ball. Stabæk decided not to buy him at the end of the season. On 27 January 2010, Kobayashi signed on a free transfer to the Greek team Iraklis Thessaloniki for 18 months. Kobayashi only appeared in 15 matches for Iraklis. At the end of the 2010–11 season he returned to Japan, signing a deal with Shimizu S-Pulse.

During January 2013 he went on trial with Vancouver Whitecaps FC in the MLS. He impressed during his trial stint and signed with the club for the 2013 season. The club declined to offer him a contract for the 2014 season and his rights were traded to the New England Revolution before the start of the season in exchange for a fourth-round pick in the 2016 MLS SuperDraft. In late 2015, Kobayashi received his U.S. green card, which qualified him as a domestic player for MLS roster purposes. In March 2018, Kobayashi joined Las Vegas Lights FC. In January 2019, Kobayashi signed with Birmingham Legion FC.

National team
He represented Japan U-20 national team at the World Youth Championship in 2003, where they reached the quarter-finals before being beaten by eventual champions Brazil. He did not start their first group game, a loss against Colombia, but he started the next two which they won to secure a top spot, including a win against England. He further played in the round of 16 win against South Korea, but had to be replaced early in the quarter finals. He also represented Japan U20 at the AFC Youth Championship in 2002, where they came second, after losing 1–0 in against South Korea in the final.

He earned his first cap for Japan in a friendly match against Trinidad and Tobago on 9 August 2006, coming on as a 56th-minute substitute for Koji Yamase.

Statistics

Club

International
Sources:

Honours

Tokyo Verdy
Emperor's Cup: 2004
Japanese Super Cup: 2005

Stabæk
Super Cup: 2009

Japan
AFC Youth Championship Runner-up: 2002

New England Revolution
MLS Eastern Conference
Winners (Playoff): 2014

Individual
J.League All-Star Soccer selected: 2006, 2007

References

External links

 
 Japan National Football Team Database
 
 
 

1983 births
Living people
Association football people from Shizuoka Prefecture
Iraklis Thessaloniki F.C. players
J1 League players
Japan international footballers
Japan youth international footballers
Japanese expatriate footballers
Japanese expatriate sportspeople in Norway
Japanese expatriate sportspeople in Greece
Japanese expatriate sportspeople in Canada
Japanese expatriate sportspeople in the United States
Japanese footballers
Expatriate soccer players in Canada
Expatriate footballers in Greece
Expatriate footballers in Norway
Expatriate soccer players in the United States
Major League Soccer players
New England Revolution players
Omiya Ardija players
Shimizu S-Pulse players
Super League Greece players
Stabæk Fotball players
Eliteserien players
Tokyo Verdy players
Vancouver Whitecaps FC players
Las Vegas Lights FC players
Birmingham Legion FC players
Association football midfielders
USL Championship players